Apalachee River may refer to:
Apalachee River (Alabama)
Apalachee River (Georgia)